Nosratollah Vahdat (7 September 1925 – 6 October 2020) was an Iranian comedian, actor, and film director. He is best known in Iran for his Esfahani-accent.

Biography 
Nosratollah Vahdat was born on 7 September 1925 in Isfahan, Pahlavi Iran. He was a pioneer of the Isfahan Theater. 

In 1964, he won the Golden Dolphin award for his film "The Bride" at the Asian Film Festival. However, after the Iranian Revolution in 1979 he ceased acting. Contemporary actors of his include Parviz Sayyad and Behrouz Vossoughi.

Filmography

1976 – Naghs-e Fanni 
1977 – 
1977 – , as actor
1976 – , as director and actor 
1976 – , as director and actor 
1974 –  
1974 –  
1973 – Ki daste gol be ab dade?
1972 – 
1965 – Poor Thing!
1964 –  
1963 – A Passenger from Heaven
1961 – The Roasted Duck
1960 – The Nobody
1960 – The Doll Behind the Window
1960 – Safarali
1959 – Luck and Love and Coincidence
1958 –  
1957 –  
1956 – The Sun Shines
1956 – The Fifth Marriage

References

External links

 

1925 births
2020 deaths
Iranian male film actors
Iranian film directors
Actors from Isfahan
Iranian comedians
Male comedians
20th-century Iranian male actors
20th-century comedians